"Try Me" is a song by American singer Jason Derulo, featuring fellow American singer Jennifer Lopez and Norwegian DJ Matoma, who also produced the song. It was released as the third single exclusively in Europe from his fourth studio album, Everything Is 4 (2015). The single was released on May 26, 2015. "Try Me" is also included on Matoma's debut studio album, Hakuna Matoma.

Background 
Derulo told Capital FM that he was in the studio working on some material for Lopez’s next album, when Lopez suggested they work on something for his album, as it was coming out sooner.

Composition 
The song is a pop ballad which contains breezy, tropical, and Balearic beats. According to Newsday Glenn Gomboa, the song is a "mix of an old-school pop duet and of-the-moment, Latin-tinged production". Dan Weiss of Spin described it as "the Afro-futurist 'Sexual Healing'". Jeff Benjamin of Fuse found the melody was reminiscent of Nick Jonas's "Jealous". Thematically, Derulo said the song is "about the prospect of meeting somebody new. You might be the person I’ve been looking for. Try me."

Critical reception 
Sam C. Mac of Slant Magazine deemed it "an ebullient pop ballad that bests Talk Dirty standout 'Trumpets' ". Vibe Marjua Estevez wrote the song "could potentially be summer's bae anthem" and called it "a perfect tune for drop-top weather", while also commending the harmony of both singers. Jeff Benjamin of Fuse wrote: "Vocally, the best moments in the track come when the singers' high and low notes are layered, serving the listener some wonderfully sensual harmonies."

Music video 
The song's accompanying music video was planned to be released, however, Derulo has confirmed that was made: "It's in the concept; the guys have to be really strong. You will understand when you actually see [the video]. It's a competition of some sort."

Track listing
CD single
"Get Ugly"
"Try Me" (featuring Jennifer Lopez and Matoma)

Charts

Certifications

References

External links
 

2015 songs
2015 singles
Jason Derulo songs
Jennifer Lopez songs
Matoma songs
Songs written by Marvin Gaye
Songs written by Jason Derulo
Songs written by Lindy Robbins
Warner Records singles
Tropical house songs